Puffed rice and popped rice (or pop rice) are types of puffed grain made from rice commonly eaten in the traditional cuisines of Southeast Asia, East Asia, and South Asia. It has also been produced commercially in the West since 1904 and is popular in breakfast cereals and other snack foods.

Traditional methods to puff or pop rice include frying in oil or salt. Western commercial puffed rice is usually made by heating rice kernels under high pressure in the presence of steam, though the method of manufacture varies widely. They are either eaten as loose grains or made into puffed rice cakes.

Description
While the terms "puffed rice" and "popped rice" are used interchangeably, they are properly different processes. Puffed rice refers to pre-gelatinized rice grains (either by being parboiled, boiled, or soaked) that are puffed by the rapid expansion of steam upon cooking. Puffed rice retains the shape of the rice grain, but is much larger. Popped rice, on the other hand, refers to rice grains where the hull or the bran is intact. When cooked, the kernel explodes through the hard outer covering due to heating. Popped rice has an irregular shape similar to popcorn. There are various methods, both modern and traditional, for making puffed and popped rice.

Traditional versions by region

East Asia
Puffed rice or other grains are occasionally found as street food in China (called "mixiang" 米香), Taiwan (called "bí-phang" 米芳), Korea (called "ppeong twigi" 뻥튀기), and Japan (called "pon gashi" ポン菓子), where hawkers implement the puffing process using an integrated pushcart/puffer featuring a rotating steel pressure chamber heated over an open flame. The great booming sound produced by the release of pressure serves as advertising.

China mainland

The earliest mention of puffed rice in China mainland is in Zhejiang Province, from a book by Fan Chengda written in the Song Dynasty (c. 1100). It was part of the rituals of the Spring Festival and was made in large cooking pots known as fǔ (釜) which was heated with woodfire. Puffed rice, known as bào chǎo mǐ huā lou (爆炒米花), is still a traditional street food in Shanghai where it is made by frying rice in oil and sugar.

Japan

Traditional puffed rice cakes in Japanese cuisine are known as  'thunder cakes' or simply . In Edo Japan, the name okoshi was related to good luck, as the similar word okosu means to establish or set up. It is made by deep-frying sun-dried rice grains until they pop. It is then mixed with syrup (and other ingredients like peanuts or sesame seeds), pressed into trays, and dried. They are cut up into squarish or rectangular blocks before being sold. Traditional okoshi boxes feature images of Raijin, the Japanese god of thunder and lightning. Its earliest attestation was during the middle of the Edo Period, where it was sold as a snack outside the Sensō-ji of Asakusa, Tokyo. Modern okoshi can use a variety of other ingredients and flavors and are usually factory-made.

Its name literally means "carrot" because it is sold in a carrot-shaped cone.

Puffed rice is also used in  'brown rice tea', a traditional Japanese tea beverage consisting of green tea mixed with roasted puffed brown rice.

Taiwan
In Taiwan, puffed rice is known as Bí-phang or pōng-bí-phang (the word "pōng" is the sound of the explosion when the pressure furnace is opened) in Taiwanese, Mi-hsiang in Mandarin.

Korea

In Korea, puffed rice is known as twibap and is used to make yeot-gangjeong or to coat gangjeong.

Korea also has a tea beverage made with puffed rice called hyeonmi-nokcha (현미녹차, literally "brown rice green tea") made with green tea and roasted puffed brown rice.

Southeast Asia

Philippines 

In Filipino cuisine, traditional puffed rice is known as ampaw or ampao (a term which also became applied to popcorn). It is made with cooked white rice (usually leftovers). It is dried in the sun for around four hours. They are then fried in hot oil to make them puff up. The oil is drained thoroughly after frying. The sugar glazing is cooked separately using muscovado sugar or molasses (or corn syrup),  salt, butter, and vinegar or calamansi juice. The glazing is poured unto the puffed rice and mixed until the grains are evenly coated. It is then allowed to cool and shaped into the desired form before it fully hardens. They are usually cut into square or rectangular blocks or molded into balls.

Thailand
In Thai cuisine, a traditional popped rice snack is krayasaat (กระยาสารท). It is associated with the Buddhist Saat festival which is celebrated in autumn. It can be made with regular rice or glutinous rice. It is roasted directly in a dry pan like popcorn until they pop. It is mixed with caramelized palm sugar, coconut milk, peanuts, sesame seeds, and khao mao (pounded green rice).

Malaysia
In Malay cuisine, traditional puffed rice is known as bepang pulut especially in Terengganu state. Glutinous rice is dried under sunlight and cooked with palm sugar. It is different from regular bepang which uses ground nuts instead of glutinous rice. Bepang pulut is famous as a gift from the host during wedding ceremony to visitors.

South Asia
Nepal

Puffed Rice is a popular snack in Nepal which is known as "Bhuja"-भुजा. It is used in a wide variety of recipes from simply eating it directly to making other dishes. Some people also refer to rice as bhuja which can be a little confusing.

India 

In India, puffed rice is known as muri. Other regional names includes parmal, puri, mudhi, murmura, murmuri, borugulu, maramaralu in Andhra Pradesh, Telangana and pori in Tamil Nadu. It is a staple food in Odisha and West Bengal.

It has been made since ancient times using a technique called hot salt frying in which parboiled rice (i.e. steamed and then dried) is puffed by preheated salt. Salt is heated in a pan until it is hot enough to pop rice added to it within seconds. Parboiled or dried pre-cooked rice is added to the heated contents of the pan and stirred. Puffing starts almost immediately and completes in less than a minute and the rice is scooped out by a sieve.

Puffed rice is an ingredient of bhel puri, a popular Indian chaat (snack). It is offered to Hindu gods and goddesses in all poojas in the southern Indian states of Kerala and Tamil Nadu. Pilgrims of Sabarimala often pack puffed rice in their Irumudikettu along with jaggery meant to be offered to Lord Ayyappan. Tamil saints say that Lord Ganesh loves pori, so it should be offered to him without fail. Pori has been mentioned in various Tamil literatures as an offering to Hindu deities. Offerings of pori and jaggery made to Vinayagar (Lord Ganesh) are mentioned in the Tiruppugazh, a 15th-century anthology of Tamil religious songs, written by Tamil poet Arunagirinathar. In Gujarati cuisine it is called 'Mamra' and are often used to make a dry snack by shallow frying in oil with spices or made into sweet balls using jaggery and ghee.

In Telangana, as a snack typically given to children, puffed rice or borugulu is made into ball with jaggery sugar syrup or bellam pakam.

In Karnataka, puffed rice is mixed with carrots, tomatoes, spices and coriander leaves to make churumuri, a popular evening snack.

Under the initiative of Make in India, the Central Government of India decided that mudhi from Odisha would be part Indian traditional food among 12 traditional dishes from different states that would be launched globally.

In Mithila and Bengal area, puffed rice is had with "kachari"-fried potato/onion chops, fried fish or with mutton curry. "Jhal-muri" and "Murhi-Bhuja" are also very popular snacks in this area. In Madhya Pradesh, this is referred to as Parmal and its very often eaten with Sev as a snack and also used in Bhel.
In some area it is also known as laai, dishes made from it called sweet laai, laai poha etc.

Bangladesh 

Puffed Rice is a popular snack in Bangladesh. Mostly used to make Jhalmuri, it is the most common and cheapest snack in Bangladesh. They use the same ancient method as India to prepare the puffed rice. This snack can be found anywhere in Bangladesh. In Old Dhaka, the jhalmuri -wala (Jhalmuri-seller) is still often seen dressed in colourful clothes, wearing anklet bells and calling out to the residents. Puffed rice is also mixed with jaggery and shaped into a rounded ball snack called murir moa.

Rest of the world

Czech Republic and Slovakia
In 1960s Czechoslovakia, state firm Vitana was the first to begin the production of 'expanded rice', as plain flavoured or sweetened snack. The product became popular under the names burizony or arizonky. These continue to be produced to this day in Pardubice or Sereď.

Modern commercial production
Puffed rice is formed by the reaction of both starch and moisture when heated within the shell of the grain. Unlike corn, rice kernels are naturally lacking in moisture and must first be conditioned with steam. Puffed rice can be created by heating the steam-conditioned kernels either with oil or in an oven. Rice puffed in this way is crisp, and known as "crisped rice". Oven-crisped rice is used to produce the Rice Krispies breakfast cereal as well as the crisped rice used in Lion Bars, Nestlé Crunch, Krackel, and similar chocolate bars. Though not as dramatic a change when compared to popcorn, the process and end result are the same.

When the pressure is suddenly released, the pressure stored inside the kernel causes it to puff out. This method produces a puffed rice which is spongy in texture.

Rice can also be puffed by making a rice dough, and extruding small pellets which are then rapidly heated. The moisture in the dough flash boils and puffs the rice up. A cereal such as Cap'n Crunch is extruded, cooked, cut, pressurized, puffed and dried in a continuous process.

The method of modern industrial puffed rice production is attributed to American inventor Alexander P. Anderson, who stumbled across puffing while trying to ascertain the water content of a single granule of starch, introduced the first puffing machine at the World's Fair in Saint Louis, Missouri, in 1904. His eight "guns" that puffed grains for Fair goers were dubbed "The Eighth Wonder of the World" by an advertising billboard poster. Once the puffing principle, technique and technology had been discovered by Anderson, the competition to puff ready-to-eat American breakfast cereal took over the economy of Battle Creek, Michigan, with Kellogg's and Quaker Oats being two memorable and still active names to endure through the early puffing frenzy.

In the United States and Europe, puffed rice is served with milk as a breakfast cereal, a popular brand of this is Rice Krispies. Some chocolate bars, such as the Nestlé Crunch, include puffed rice, and puffed rice cakes are sold as low-calorie snacks.

See also

 Puffed grain
 Puffed rice cakes
 Flattened rice

References

Breakfast cereals
Rice dishes
Dried foods
Rice crackers